Said Mohamed Duale (18 September 1947 – 1 April 2020) was a Somali international footballer.

Death
Duale died in 2020, following a short illness.

References

1947 births
2020 deaths
People from Aden
Association football forwards
Al Wahda FC players
Zamalek SC players
Al-Tilal SC players
Somalian footballers
Somalia international footballers
Somalian expatriate footballers
Expatriate footballers in the United Arab Emirates
Expatriate footballers in Egypt